HD 20367 is a star in the constellation of Aries, close to the border with the Perseus constellation. It is a yellow-white hued star that is a challenge to view with the naked eye, having an apparent visual magnitude of 6.40. Based upon parallax measurements, it is located 85 light years from the Sun. It is drifting further away with a radial velocity of +6.5 km/s. Based upon its movement through space, it is a candidate member of the Ursa Major Moving Group of co-moving stars that probably share a common origin.

This object is a late F-type main-sequence star with a stellar classification of F8V. It is about three billion years old and is spinning with a projected rotational velocity of 5.5 km/s. The star is 12% larger and 13% more massive than the Sun. It is radiating 1.58 times the luminosity of the Sun from its photosphere at an effective temperature of 6,100 K.


Claims of a planetary system 
The eccentric nature of this planet's orbit meant that it spends part of each circuit around the star outside the habitable zone. However, subsequent observations in 2009 put the existence of this planet in doubt.

See also
List of extrasolar planets

References

External links
 
 HIP 15323 Catalog
 Image HD 20367
 Sky map

F-type main-sequence stars
Hypothetical planetary systems
Aries (constellation)
BD+30 0520
020367
015323